The Jordan women's national basketball team is the nationally controlled basketball team representing Jordan at world basketball competitions for women.

Asian championship
Jordan played in one Asian championships, taking eleventh place in 1995 ABC Championship for Women.

Pan-Arab games
Jordan women's team finished third in two tournaments, the first was in 1999 which was hosted in Amman, Jordan; the second was in 2011 which was held in Qatar.

Current squad
Jordan's squad which participated at the 2011 Pan Arab Games: 

|}
| valign="top" |
 Head coach

Legend
Club – describes lastclub before the tournament
Age – describes ageon 19 December 2011
|}
 Rubi Habash transferred to Al-Fuhais afterwards.

References

External links
Jordanian Basketball Federation website

Basketball in Jordan
Women's national basketball teams
basketball